Lieutenant-Colonel Thomas Howard Chapman,  was director of public works of Ceylon and acting commander of the Ceylon Defence Force. He was appointed on 1 January 1920 until 21 July 1920. He was succeeded by F. M. G. Rowley.

References

Commanders of the Ceylon Defence Force
20th-century British Army personnel
Officers of the Order of the British Empire
British civil servants in Ceylon
Members of the Legislative Council of Ceylon